P. senegalus may refer to:
 Polypterus senegalus, the gray bichir, Senegal bichir, Cuvier's bichir or dinosaur eel, a freshwater ray-finned fish species
 Poicephalus senegalus, the Senegal parrot, a bird species found in western Africa

See also
 Senegalus